Futaleufú is a department in the north west of Chubut Province, Argentina. Its main town and capital is Esquel to the north, with Trevelin and El Corcovado as the only other towns of significant size. Other settlements are Cerro Centinela, Aldea Escolar, Los Cipreses and Lago Rosario.

The partido is bordered to the north by the Cushamen Department, to the south and east by the Languiñeo Department and to the west by Chile. The name comes from the Futaleufú River, which originates in the Los Alerces National Park and flows through the department into Chile and on to the Pacific Ocean.

Settlements

Esquel
Trevelín
Corcovado
Lago Rosario
Aldea Escolar 
Los Cipreses
Villa Futalaufquen
Cerro Centinela
Nahuel Pan
Los Tepues
Barrancas 
Cabaña A. Pescado

Attractions
La Hoya Ski Resort
Los Alerces National Park
La Trochita, historic 1922 narrow gauge railway

References

External links
 Esquel Online 
 Esquel Municipal Website
 Esquel Informacion, Fotos

States and territories established in 1906
Departments of Chubut Province
1906 establishments in Argentina